Joakim Edström (born 27 November 1992) is a Swedish footballer who plays as a forward. He is son of the former Swedish national team player Ralf Edström.

References

External links

Joakim Edström profile

1992 births
Living people
GAIS players
Association football forwards
Swedish footballers
Allsvenskan players
Utsiktens BK players